Johann Jakob Kneucker (12 February 1840 – 25 December 1909) was a German theologian born in the village of Wenkheim, today part of Werbach, Baden-Württemberg.

In 1873 he received his habilitation at the University of Heidelberg, where in 1877 he became an associate professor to the theological faculty. He specialized in the fields of Old Testament exegesis and Semitic languages.

His best known written work was an edition of the Book of Baruch, titled "Das Buch Baruch, Geschichte und Kritik" (The Book of Baruch, History and Critique, 1879). Another significant publication of his was "Die Anfänge des Römischen Christenthums" (Beginnings of Roman Christendom, 1881).

References 
 Der Lehrkörper Ruperto Carola zu Heidelberg (short biography)
 Open Library (bibliography)

External links
 
 

1840 births
1909 deaths
People from Main-Tauber-Kreis
People from the Grand Duchy of Baden
19th-century German theologians
German Christian theologians
German male non-fiction writers
19th-century male writers
Academic staff of Heidelberg University